Notre Dame of Kiamba (NDK) is a private school in National Highway, Poblacion, Kiamba, Sarangani
 formerly run by Marist Brothers.  NDK has been a member of the Notre Dame Educational Association, a group of Notre Dame Schools in the Philippines under the patronage of the Blessed Virgin Mary.

References

Catholic universities and colleges in the Philippines
Notre Dame Educational Association
Marist Brothers schools
Catholic elementary schools in the Philippines
Catholic secondary schools in the Philippines
Schools in Sarangani